is a village located in Hata District, Kōchi Prefecture, Japan.

Geography
Mihara is located in a mountainous region in western Kōchi Prefecture on the island of Shikoku. It is approximately 153 km from the Kōchi prefectural capital, Kōchi city. Surrounded by mountains of 450 to 850 meters, it is located independently of the neighboring three cities of Nakamura, Sukumo, and Tosashimizu. Most of the village is forest, and villages and cultivated land are scattered along the Shimonokae River and its tributaries.

Neighboring municipalities
Kōchi Prefecture
Shimanto city
Sukumo
Tosashimizu

Climate
Mihara has a Humid subtropical climate (Köppen Cfa) characterized by warm summers and cool winters with light snowfall.  The average annual temperature in Mihara is 16.7 °C. The average annual rainfall is 2074 mm with September as the wettest month. The temperatures are highest on average in January at around 21.6 °C, and lowest in January, at around 7.0 °C.

Demographics
Per Japanese census data, the population of Mihara has decreased steadily since the 1960s.

History 
As with all of Kōchi Prefecture, the area of Mihara was part of ancient Tosa Province. During the Edo period, the area was part of the holdings of Tosa Domain ruled by the Yamauchi clan from their seat at Kōchi Castle. The village of Mihara was established with the creation of the modern municipalities system on October 1, 1889.

Government
Mihara has a mayor-council form of government with a directly elected mayor and a unicameral village council of eight members. Mihara, together with Sukumo and Ōtsuki, contributes two members to the Kōchi Prefectural Assembly. In terms of national politics, the village is part of Kōchi 2nd district of the lower house of the Diet of Japan.

Economy
The local economy is centered on forestry and agriculture. Mihara Village is surrounded by dense mountain forests and clear, pristine rivers providing ideal conditions for farming and agriculture. As a result, Mihara Village has become well known for its superior rice and vegetable produce.

Education
Mihara has one public elementary school and one public middle school operated by the village government. The village does not have a high school.

Transportation

Railway
Mihara has no passenger railway service. The nearest station is Hirata Station on the Tosa Kuroshio Railway Sukumo Line in the neighboring city of Sukumo.

Highway
Mihara is not on any national highway or expressway.

Local attractions
Doburoku - Doburoku is a type of undistllled rice wine which is creamy in texture with a unique flavor and very potent. Although Doburoku is not exclusive to the village, Mihara is one of the few places that still produce doburoku. In addition, there is a Doburoku Festival held annually in Mihara on 3 November.

Tosa Suzuri Factory - Mihara is also home to the Tosa Suzuri Factory. Suzuri (硯) is the Japanese word for the inkstone used for Japanese calligraphy or shodō (書道). Tosa Ink stones have a strong reputation nationwide for producing a high quality Ink and are sought after by calligraphers all over Japan.

Noted people from Mihara
Norio Takeuchi, politician

References

External links

Mihara official website 
Mihara English-language website

Villages in Kōchi Prefecture